The TCDD (Turkish Republic Railways) 5701 Class is a class of 2-10-2 side tank steam locomotives for banking at Bilecik.  They were the last new main line steam locomotives built for TCDD.  Two were built by Henschel in 1951 and two by Jung in 1952 based on the German DRG BR 85.  The first of the class, 5701 survives at the Çamlık Railway Museum.

External links
TCDD 5701

2-10-2T locomotives
05701
Henschel locomotives
Steam locomotives of Turkey
Standard gauge locomotives of Turkey